Aoxin or Jiangsu Aoxin New Energy Automobile Co., Ltd. (江苏奥新新能源汽车有限公司) is a Chinese automobile manufacturer headquartered in Jiangsu, China, is a low-speed electric vehicle company that produces Neighborhood Electric Vehicles.
.

History
Aoxin was founded in 2006, and is based in Jiangsu. Aoxin has current exported products to United States, New Zealand, Spain, Germany, and Italy. The company's main goal is to create light-weight electric vehicles. By 2050, Aoxin plans to have 56 vehicles, including a garbage truck, garbage dump truck, sweeper truck, electric van, pure electric self-loading and unloading garbage truck, electric stake truck, electric  vending truck, and an electric advertising vehicle. Most of Aoxin's service vehicles are made and produced by Dafudi.

Their factory is  2.21 square kilometers large, and includes a park and test track. The factory also produces 200,000 sets of automotive composites material of various preparation forming process. It will also have the ability to make 30,000 sets of three kinds of extender (fuel extender, gas turbines, and fuel battery).

Aoxin produced the Star truck in 2009. It was a low-speed, cost effective small truck. Aoxin said "Because this small truck is practical, convenient, cost-effective, it quickly became very important and popular means of transportation for peoples in the United States and some other places for cargo transportation and courier usage."

Aoxin then made the AEV1, a 5-door hatchback. It was made in 2009.

The Aoxin eGo is a 3-door, 2 seat compact hatchback made and introduced in 2011. Its dimensions are 2960 mm/1710 mm/1598 mm, a wheelbase of 1958 mm, with a kerb weight of 800 kg.

In 2014, Aoxin created the IBIS sedan. The IBIS is also known as the Aoxin E45 or Aoxin Heying. The body is made of carbon fiber with an aluminum frame. Its dimensions measure 5000 mm/1898 mm/1605 mm with kerb weight of 1815 kg.

The A59 is an electric dump truck. It measures 3920 mm/1500 mm/1900 mm, with a wheelbase of 2500 mm, and a kerb weight of 1330 kg.

Aoxin's X30L is a large-sized van. It was first produced in 2019, with an average unit production of 2,000 per year.

The Aoxin A1XD is a 2-door compact box truck. It was renamed the Dafudi A1XD from 2018 to 2019, but as of January 2020, it became remade under the Aoxin brand. Its dimensions measure 4330 mm/1500 mm/2210 mm, with a wheelbase of 2500mm, and a kerb weight of 1280 kg. It takes 6–8 hours to fully charge.

The Environmental Sanitation is an electric street sweeper. Its dimensions are 4400 mm/1500 mm/2150 mm, with a wheelbase of 2500 mm, and a weight of 1670 kg. It has been rated 95% cleaning efficiency in China, 93% in Japan, 97% in Germany, and 88% in the United States.

Vehicles

Aoxin eGo

Body style: Hatchback
Class: A
Doors: 3
Seats: 2
Battery: 4 kWh
Production: 2011–present
Revealed: 2011

Aoxin IBIS

Body style: Sedan
Doors: 4
Seats: 5
Battery: 72 kWh
Production: 2016–present
Revealed: 2014 Shanghai Auto Show, 2015 New Energy Auto Show

Aoxin Star

Body style: pickup truck
Doors: 2
Seats: 5 
Production: 2009–present
Revealed: 2009 Shanghai Electric Vehicles And Energy-saving Exhibition

Aoxin AEV1

Body style: Hatchback
Doors: 5
Battery: lithium iron phosphate 
Production: 2009–present

Aoxin A59

Body style: Garbage truck
Doors: 2
Seats: 5
Battery: Lithium

Aoxin A1XD

Body style: Box truck
Doors: 2
Seats: 5

Aoxin Environmental Sanitation

Body style: Street Sweeper
Doors: 2
Seats: 2
Battery: Three-element lithium

Aoxin X30L

Body style: Van
Production: 2019–present

Models Sold under Dafudi brand

Refrigerated trucks
JAX5024XLCBEVF266LB15M2X1 
JAX5020XLCBEVF216LB15M2X1

Box truck cargo van
JAX5021XXYBEVF220LB15M2X1
JAX5025XXYBEVF216LB15M2X2
JAX5026XXYBEVF216LB15M2X1
JAX5024XXYBEVF268LB15M2X1
JAX5024XXYBEVF268LB15M2X2
JAX5025XXYBEVF216LB15M2X1
JAX5024XXYBEVF266LB15M2X1
JAX5024XXYBEVF216LB15M2X1
JAX5021XXYBEVF216LB15M2X2
JAX5021XXYBEVF216LB15M2X1
JAX5044XXYBEVF230LB70M2X2
JAX5027XXYBEVF276LB15M2X1
JAX5020XXYBEVF135LAB15M2X2
JAX5021XXYBEV
JAX5023XXYBEVF120LB15M2X2
JAX5023XXYBEV
JAX5022XXYBEVF170LB15M2X1
JAX5022XXYBEV
JAX5022XXYBEVF120LB15M2X2
JAX5020XXYBEV
JAX5020XXYBEVF120LB15M2X2
JAX5020CPYBEVF135LAB15M1X1
JAX5020CPYBEVF120LB15M1X1

Stake truck
JAX5020CCYBEVF120LB15M1C1
JAX5020CCYBEVF135LAB15M1C1

Mobile shop
JAX5020XSHBEVF120LB15M3X1
JAX5020XSHBEVF135LAB15M3X1

Garbage Truck
JAX5025ZZZBEVF170LB15M2Z1
JAX5022ZZZBEVF170LB15M2Z1
JAX5020ZLJBEVF120LB15M1Z1
JAX5020ZLJBEVF135LAB15M1Z1
JAX5022CTYBEVF170LB15M2C1
JAX5022ZXXBEVF170LB15M2Z1
JAX5023ZXXBEV
JAX5020ZXXBEV
JAX5022ZXXBEV
JAX5021ZXXBEV

Propaganda van
JAX5020XXCBEVF120LB15M5X1
JAX5020XXCBEVF135LAB15M5X1

Street sweeper
JAX5060TSLQLIV
JAX5070TSLQLIIICS
JAX5060TSLQLIIICS
JAX5070TSLQLIICS
JAX5061TSLBJIIICS
JAX5043TSLQLIIICS
JAX5150TSLDFIIICS
JFQ5070TSLQLIIICS
JFQ5060TSLQLIIICS
JFQ5070TSLQLIICS
JFQ5061TSLBJIIICS
JFQ5043TSLQLIIICS
JFQ5150TSLDFIIICS
JAX5022TSLBEVF170LB15M1T1
JAX5024TSLBEVF266LB15M1T1

Sales
From 2019 to 2020, Aoxin sold 120,000 units.

See also
 Bordrin
 Lichi (car brand)
 Sinogold
 Gyon
 BYD

References

Electric vehicle manufacturers of China
Car brands
Car manufacturers of China
Chinese brands